Margaret Bailey may refer to:

 Margaret Ann Montgomery Bailey (1879–1955), Australian headmistress
 Margaret E. Bailey (1915–2014), first black United States Army Nurse Corps colonel
 Margaret Jewett Smith Bailey (1812–1882), American pioneer, missionary, and author from Oregon